The 2020 Cork Junior A Football Championship was the 122nd staging of the Cork Junior A Football Championship since its establishment by the Cork County Board in 1895. The championship was suspended indefinitely due to the impact of the COVID-19 pandemic on Gaelic games, but began on 19 June 2021 and ended on 7 August 2021.

On 7 August 2021, Iveleary win the championship after a 3–11 to 1–06 win over Boherbue in the final at Mallow GAA Complex. It was their first championship title.

Iveleary's Chris Óg Jones was the championship's top scorer with 6–17.

Format change 

The championship had featured 16 teams, comprising the divisional champions and runners-up, since 2017. Because of time constraints as a result of the ongoing COVID-19 pandemic it was decided to revert to the old system of allowing only the divisional champions take part.

Qualification

Fixtures/results

Quarter-finals

Semi-finals

Final

Championship statistics

Top scorers

Overall

In a single game

References

External links
 2020 Cork JAFC fixtures

Cork Junior A Football Championship
Cork Championship